The blue mockingbird (Melanotis caerulescens) is a species of bird in the family Mimidae. It is endemic to Mexico, but has occurred as a vagrant in the southern United States. Its natural habitats are subtropical or tropical dry forests, subtropical or tropical moist montane forests, and heavily degraded former forest.

The blue mockingbird is uniformly blue on its back, tail, wings, head and underbelly. This color is a result of feather structure rather than pigment, and therefore can look gray in the shade. It has a black "mask" surrounding its reddish-brown eyes. It has a rather long, slightly graduated tail, and dark blue streaks over its breast. Its bill is long, thin and slightly curved, and its legs and feet are black.

Taxonomy 
When he first described the blue mockingbird in 1827, William John Swainson assigned it to the mockingbird Orpheus, and when Orpheus became a junior synonym for the genus Mimus, the species was moved accordingly.  Not all authorities agreed; several placed it in the thrush Turdus.  However, when Charles Lucien Bonaparte moved it to its current genus Melanotis in 1850, most authorities quickly followed suit.  There is disagreement as to whether it is monotypic or not.

Among taxonomists who believe the species is polytypic, two subspecies are generally recognized.
M. c. caerulescens, the nominate subspecies, is found in the pine-oak zone of western Mexico, from southern Sonora south to the Isthmus of Tehuantepec.
M. c. longirostris is found only on the Tres Marías Islands, off the coast of western Mexico.

The blue mockingbird has historically been considered conspecific with the closely related blue-and-white mockingbird. Its species name is derived from the Latin adjective caerǔlěus, meaning "blue."

Description 

Habitat and range 
The blue mockingbird lives in a variety of woodlands: humid forest, riparian thickets, scrub, pine-oak forests and second growth.

Behavior

Breeding 
The blue mockingbird builds a cup nest of twigs and rootlets.

Food and feeding 
The blue mockingbird is an omnivore; it feeds primarily on invertebrates, but also on some vegetable matter.

Conservation and threats 
Because of its very large range and sizable population (estimated to number 500,000–4,999,999 individuals), the blue mockingbird is rated as a species of least concern by the International Union for Conservation of Nature. There is, however, evidence that its overall numbers are dropping, primarily due to habitat fragmentation and loss. The Mexican government has named the longirostris subspecies as a taxon of "special concern".

References

External links 
 Blue Mockingbird near Douglas, Arizona
 Blue Mockingbird at El Dorado Park in Long Beach, California
 Blue Mockingbird Images Arizona / El Dorado Park in Long Beach, California

blue mockingbird
Birds of Mexico
Endemic birds of Mexico
blue mockingbird
Taxonomy articles created by Polbot
Birds of the Sierra Madre Occidental
Birds of the Sierra Madre del Sur